Dedebit F.C.
 Dedebit (town)
 Dedebit airstrike
 Dedebit Credit and Saving Institution SC